Sands of Destruction is a role-playing video game developed by Imageepoch and published by Sega for the Nintendo DS. It was released in Japan in 2008, and in North America in 2010. The story revolves around a young man, Kyrie, who possesses the power to destroy the world, though he does not know why. The female lead is Morte, a member of a group that is trying to destroy the world.

Gameplay

Sands of Destruction plays as a traditional Japanese role-playing video game. The game is made with 2D sprite characters in a 3D environment with a rotatable camera. The battle system is turn based, but has timing and fighting game influences, and utilizes both of the DS's screens.

Plot

Setting
The game takes place in a fictional world ruled by anthropomorphic beings known as Ferals. Humans live as slaves, and a group dubbed the "World Annihilation Front" intends to destroy the world in rebellion. They are opposed by the Feral's "World Salvation Committee".

Development
The development team of the game comprised over fifty people and includes key designers who previously worked on Xenogears, as well as former staff from Grandia, Drakengard and Etrian Odyssey. The game was directed by Kyoki Mikage of Imageepoch and produced by Yoichi Shimosato of Sega.

The score of the game was composed by Yasunori Mitsuda, Shunsuke Tsuchiya, and Kazumi Mitome. The opening theme was performed by the Czech Philharmonic. A promotional album titled World Destruction Premium Soundtrack was offered with pre-orders of the game in Japan.

The original story draft for the game written by Masato Kato was allegedly much darker in tone and more violent than the final product. In it, humans were food for the Ferals, rather than merely subservient, and there were several scenes of human characters being killed and eaten. Fearing a restrictive rating from Japan's CERO and wanting to market the game to younger audiences, the game's producers had the story altered to appeal to a mainstream Japanese audience. Yoichi Shimosato, the game's producer at Sega, later expressed in an interview that while he felt the developers had made the right decision in regards to marketing the game in Japan, the original concept would have been "more fun and compelling".

North American version
At the Tokyo Gameshow, Ryoei Mikage, the president of imageepoch confirmed that his team is working to localize World Destruction, to be published by Sega USA. A new/rewritten musical score will be created by Yasunori Mitsuda, and the difficulty may be tweaked for the North American release. In December 2008, Sega officially announced its plans to release the title in North America, where it was released on January 12, 2010.

Reception

In Japan, the game sold 56,000 copies in Japan in its debut week.

The game received "mixed" reviews according to the review aggregation website Metacritic. Nintendo Power praised the game's battle system and dungeon design but criticized the story and characters as being generic. RPGLand praised the character development while being critical of town exploration and low replay value, ultimately concluding, "Sands of Destruction ends up being good, but not great." RPGamer said that its quality story and presentation were held back by enemies "abusing" the battle system. The review concludes, "Unfortunately, its many irritations in combat cause the game to fall short of the lofty status it wanted to achieve."

Legacy

An anime adaptation, also titled Sands of Destruction was produced by Production I.G and directed by Shunsuke Tada. It began broadcasting on TV Tokyo on July 7, 2008 and ended on September 30, 2008, spawning 13 episodes. A manga adaptation, began serialization in July 2008 in the Japanese magazine Dengeki Maoh.

Notes

References

External links
 Official World Destruction website 

2008 video games
Fantasy anime and manga
Fantasy video games
Funimation
Image Epoch games
Manga based on video games
Nintendo DS games
Nintendo DS-only games
Production I.G
Role-playing video games
Sega video games
Sega Games franchises
Seinen manga
TV Tokyo original programming
Video games scored by Yasunori Mitsuda
Video games developed in Japan
Single-player video games